Tom Abs (born 1972) is an American multi-instrumentalist and filmmaker. He works primarily in jazz, free jazz, and free improvisation, and plays double bass, tuba, cello, violin, didgeridoo, and wooden flute, often playing several instruments simultaneously.

Career
A native of Seattle, Washington, Abs attended The New School, studying with Reggie Workman, Buster Williams, Joe Chambers, Brian Smith, Junior Mance, Arnie Lawrence, Chico Hamilton, and Arthur Taylor. He began his performing career in 1992.

He has worked with Lawrence "Butch" Morris, Charles Gayle, Daniel Carter, Cooper-Moore, Steve Swell, Roy Campbell, Jr., Sabir Mateen, Ori Kaplan, Jemeel Moondoc, Assif Tsahar, Borah Bergman, Billy Bang, Andrew Lamb, and Warren Smith. Abbs is a member of Triptych Myth, Yuganaut, and Transmitting (with Napoleon Maddox and Jane LeCroy). He leads the band Frequency Response and tours with his solo multimedia act Multifarious. He has collaborated with the painter M. P. Landis.

Abbs is the founder of the arts coalition Jump Arts, which presented performances and workshops throughout New York City from 1997 to 2002.

He was the general manager of ESP-Disk from 2007 to 2010 and founded Northern Spy Records which he co-owns with Adam Downey.

Discography

As leader
 Conscription (CIMP, 2003)
 Titration with Active Ingredients (Delmark, 2003)
 The Animated Adventures of Knox (482 Music, 2006)
 Live at the Marquise Dance Hall (Small Doses, 2008)
 Lost and Found (Engine Studios, 2009)

As sideman
 Daniel Carter, The Perfect Blue (Not Two, 2010)
 Roscoe Mitchell, Four Ways (Nessa, 2017)

References

External links
Tom Abbs page from Jump Arts site
Tom Abbs interview by John Sharpe, June 23, 2008
[ Tom Abbs discography] from Allmusic

Musicians from Seattle
Musicians from Brooklyn
American experimental filmmakers
1972 births
Didgeridoo players
American jazz double-bassists
Male double-bassists
American jazz tubists
American jazz cellists
American male jazz musicians
Living people
Avant-garde jazz cellists
Avant-garde jazz double-bassists
Avant-garde jazz flautists
Avant-garde jazz tubists
Avant-garde jazz violinists
Jazz musicians from New York (state)
21st-century double-bassists
21st-century tubists
21st-century American violinists
21st-century American male musicians
21st-century cellists
21st-century flautists